The Downtown Salem Historic District in Salem, South Dakota is a small historic district which was listed on the National Register of Historic Places in 2004.  It contained just three contributing buildings, at 140, 200 and 201 N. Main.

The three buildings are corner buildings facing onto N. Main Street.  They were built in 1889, 1902 and 1914. The three buildings were deemed to be the only ones surviving in Salem's business district and having historic integrity.

The buildings are:
Sessler Building (1914), Commercial style.
Salem Bank (1902), 200 North Main, a two-story brick Richardsonian Romanesque commercial building, with arches over its corner entrance.
1899 Bank Building (1899), also known as Old Salem Bank, 201 North Main, a two-story brick commercial building with both Italianate and Queen Anne details.

References

Historic districts on the National Register of Historic Places in South Dakota
Italianate architecture in South Dakota
Richardsonian Romanesque architecture in South Dakota
Buildings and structures completed in 1889
McCook County, South Dakota